Anan Amornkiat is a Thai football coach who is currently the technical consultant of Thailand U-23.

He previously served as coach of Bangkok Bank FC, signing a two-year contract in June 2005.

Honours
Manager

Tobacco Monopoly
 Thailand Division 1 League Champions (1): 2000

References

Living people
Anan Amornkiat
Anan Amornkiat
1945 births